Danzig law (in Polish: Gdański Wilkierz ) was the official set of records of the laws of city of Danzig (Gdańsk).

History 

The models for the Danzig Law were the statute books of the Holy Roman Empire and of other Hanseatic cities, especially Lübeck. The merchant city received Lübeck law in 1226.

In the 15th century, the Prussian Confederation was founded to oppose the policy of the Teutonic Order. The Prussian Confederation supported accession to Poland, triggering the Thirteen Years' War. During that time, Danzig continued with its own set of law system, which its self-government. The recognition of this law, and other Danzig's privileges, by the King of Poland was a prerequisite for allying with him resp. subjecting as Royal Prussia to his overlordship. The Second Peace of Thorn of 1466 confirmed the rights. When they were in danger in the 1570s, it led to the Danzig rebellion and the Siege of Danzig (1577).

In the First Partition of Poland in 1772, the Kingdom of Prussia took over Royal Prussia (but not yet Danzig and Thorn (Toruń)) and called it West Prussia. The Latin names Prussia Orientalis and Prussia Occidentalis were for centuries prior used for both parts (East and West) of Prussia. Danzig continued its self-government for two decades to come, then in 1793 was annexed by the Kingdom of Prussia and its Prussian Danzig Law codes were supplanted by standardized Prussian laws.

Danziger Willkür
There were several incarnations of the laws that mainly covered internal government:
 1435–1448 (draft)
 1455 first known written form 
 1479–1500
 1574 during succession dispute leading to the Siege of Danzig (1577)
 1597 Der See- und Handelstadt Dantzig Rechte oder Willkür ("The Laws of the Sea and Trade City of Danzig")
 1678 (draft)
 1732 re-print of the 1597 Danzig Laws, by Seelmann, Danzig
 1761

Danziger privilege
The privileges of Danzig confirmed rights of Danzig in external relations, like trading, coinage, and since 1454, with the Polish Crown. 

Danzig had a special status, due to its large population (in 1772 47,600 inside the city walls, 35,000 to 40,000 outside), its harbour and wealth. Some of its politicians maintained that it was loyal only to the King of Poland, claiming that its status was similar to an Imperial Free City. This position was never accepted by the Sejm. Modern German author compare it to status of Marseille in 16th and 17th century towards the French King.

Historians
Already in the 17th century, local historians studied the history of Danzig law, such as Elias Constantius von Treuen-Schroeder (1625–1680) and Johann Ernst von der Linde (1651–1721). They did not publish, but Gottfried Lengnich acknowledged their work in the foreword to his Ius publicum civitatis Gedanensis oder der Stadt Danzig Verfassung und Rechte (Public law of the city of Danzig, or the city's constitution and rights, 1769).
Lengnich wanted to find out whether "us Prussians ... are the Poles equal brothers or their servants"
and encouraged others to study local history, too. Among others Michael Christoph Hanow, Georg Daniel Seyler and David Braun studied the history of their home towns.

See also 
 History of Gdańsk
 Free City of Danzig (Napoleonic)
 Free City of Danzig, and its laws

References

Literature 
 Des Syndicus der Stadt Danzig Gottfried Lengnich ius publicum civitatis Gedanensis oder der Stadt Danzig Verfassung und Rechte, 1769, published by Otto Günther, Danzig 1900 (initially only intended for internal use within city administration) 
 Paul Simson: Geschichte der Danziger Willkür. Quellen und Darstellungen zur Geschichte Westpreußens Nr. 3. Danzig 1904 . Reprint: Nicolaus-Copernicus-Verlag, Münster 2006, . 
 Hans-Jürgen Bömelburg, Zwischen polnischer Ständegesellschaft und preussischem Obrigkeitsstaat: Vom Königlichen Preußen zu Westpreußen (1756–1806) 1995, Oldenbourg Wissenschaftsverlag Prussia (Germany),  

History of Gdańsk
Legal history of Germany
Legal history of Poland